Bollmaniulus is a genus of millipede in the family Parajulidae.

The following species are accepted within Bollmaniulus:

 Bollmaniulus catalinae (Chamberlin, 1940)
 Bollmaniulus concolor (Chamberlin, 1940)
 Bollmaniulus furcifer (Harger, 1872)
 Bollmaniulus hewitti (Chamberlin, 1919)
 Bollmaniulus montanae (Chamberlin, 1940)
 Bollmaniulus olympus (Causey, 1953)
 Bollmaniulus olympus Chamberlin, 1940
 Bollmaniulus pachysomus (Chamberlin, 1940)
 Bollmaniulus pearcei (Chamberlin, 1943)
 Bollmaniulus pugetensis (Chamberlin, 1940)
 Bollmaniulus rhodogeus (Chamberlin, 1940)
 Bollmaniulus signifer (Chamberlin, 1941)
 Bollmaniulus spenceri Chamberlin, 1951
 Bollmaniulus tiganus (Chamberlin, 1910)

References 

Arthropods of North America
Julida
Animals described in 1926